The commissioner of Yukon is the representative of the Government of Canada in the Canadian federal territory of Yukon. The commissioner is appointed by the federal government and, in contrast to the governor general of Canada or the lieutenant governors of the Canadian provinces, is not a viceroy and therefore not a direct representative of the Canadian monarch in the territory eo ipso.

List of commissioners

Commissioners (1894–1918)
Before the Yukon became a Territory on June 13, 1898, the Dominion agent/gold commissioner (Constantine and Fawcett) and the chief executive officer of the Yukon (Walsh for the first part of his term) was the Yukon representative.

Gold commissioners
The offices of Commissioner and Administrator were abolished in 1918. Office replaced by the Gold Commissioner who was responsible to the federal Minister of the Interior (and since 1936 the Minister of Mines and Resources). Gosselin was not a Commissioner

Comptrollers
The positions of Gold Commissioner and Comptroller were combined in 1932 with the Comptroller being the title for the chief executive. The title was changed to "Controller" in 1936.

Commissioners (1948–present)

In 1948, the title of chief executive once again became Commissioner. By the 1960s, the Commissioner had formed an executive committee that included some members of the elected Territorial Council, in essence a cabinet. (By the mid 1970s, the Territorial Council was referring to itself as a Legislative Assembly, and its members MLAs rather than Councillors.) Beginning in 1978, Yukon had party government with a Government Leader.

In October 1979, federal minister Jake Epp (Indian Affairs and Northern Development) issued a letter, often known as the Epp letter, instructing the Commissioner to assume a role similar to that of a provincial Lieutenant-Governor, and devolving leadership of the day-to-day government to the majority leader of the legislative assembly (territorial council), to whom the Epp letter granted the authority to use the title Premier.  At that time, the government leader added a fifth elected member to the committee, which became an executive council.

Subsequent federal ministers did not revoke this authority and instruction, which was eventually codified in amendments to the Yukon Act, along with redesignation of the legislative assembly from territorial council.  The process, particularly since 1979, has devolved powers from the federal government to the territorial government, bringing authority which is normally reserved by the Articles of Confederation for provinces to the territory.

References 
 
 

Specific

External links
 
 Official Handbook for Commissioners of the Territories (Canada)

Lists of office-holders in Canada

Yukon
Lists of people from Yukon
Yukon politics-related lists